The Malvern Hills Conservators are a body corporate responsible for the care and management of the Malvern Hills and Commons. They were established in 1884 and are governed by five Acts of Parliament, the Malvern Hills Acts 1884, 1909, 1924, 1930 and 1995. They became a registered charity in 1984 and since April 2017 use the working name of the Malvern Hills Trust.

Membership
The Conservators are a body of twenty-nine voluntary members, which meet as the Board four times a year; three Board Committees meet more regularly and conduct most of the day-to-day business.

Elected
Eleven members are directly elected under the 'Local Elections (Principal Areas) Rules' by the residents of the civil parishes who contribute to the Conservators' funds through a levy in their council tax (similar to the precept raised for parish councils). The town of Malvern and the parish of West Malvern together return six members (one elected by each of the six district wards constituted), the parishes of Malvern Wells and Little Malvern together elect one member (they constitute one district ward), the parish of Colwall elects two members, and the parishes of Mathon and Guarlford each elect one member.

Appointed
Further, twelve members are appointed by the local authorities that cover the Malvern Hills (eight by Malvern Hills District Council, two by Herefordshire Council and two by Worcestershire County Council), the parish councils of Colwall and Mathon each appoint a member, Worcestershire County Council appoint further members on behalf of parishes (one each for Powick, Newland and Castlemorton) and one member is appointed by the Church Commissioners.

Statutory duties
Under Acts of Parliament the Malvern Hills Conservators have the following statutory duties placed upon them:
 To prevent encroachment
 To keep the Hills and Commons as open space for recreation
 To conserve the Hills and Commons
 To protect the rights of commoners to graze their livestock on the land.

AONB Partnership
The formal Partnership for the Malvern Hills Area of Outstanding Natural Beauty (AONB) is a separate organisation, though does include the Conservators and is also based at Manor House in Great Malvern.

References

Further reading

External links

Malvern Hills Conservators National Archive
Malvern Hills Act 1995 c. iii
Malvern Hills Bill Hansard, 8 March 1993
Malvern Hills Bill Hansard, 15 February 1994

Conservation in England
Environmental organisations based in England
Charities based in Worcestershire
Malvern Hills
Local government in Herefordshire
Local government in Worcestershire
Malvern, Worcestershire